Jervey is a surname. Notable people with the surname include:

Caroline Howard Jervey (1823–1877), American author, poet
Huger Jervey (1878–1949), American lawyer and law professor
Patty Jervey (born 1964), American rugby union player
Travis Jervey (born 1972), American football player